3 Apples Fell from the Sky is a 2008 Turkish drama film produced, written and directed by Raşit Çelikezer.
This film was acted by İsmail Hacıoğlu and İlker Ayrık.

Plot 
Ali, a young petty thief, runs away from home and seeks refuge with his grandfather in Istanbul. His grandfather, an ex-military disciplinarian who at first did not even recognize his own grandson, is involved in a feud with his upstairs neighbor Nilgun, a middle-aged prostitute. We learn they are not quite what they appear to be in a spiraling chain of events that makes these three seemingly antagonistic characters come closer and closer together.

See also 
 2008 in film
 Turkish films of 2008

References

External links
 

2008 films
2008 drama films
Films set in Turkey
Turkish drama films
2000s Turkish-language films